José Milillo (born 17 November 1961) is a Venezuelan footballer. He played in one match for the Venezuela national football team in 1983. He was also part of Venezuela's squad for the 1983 Copa América tournament.

References

External links
 

1961 births
Living people
Venezuelan footballers
Venezuela international footballers
Place of birth missing (living people)
Association football midfielders
Estudiantes de Mérida players